Takaishi may refer to:

Takaishi, Osaka, a city in Osaka Prefecture, Japan
Takaishi Station
Takaishi, a character in Kodomo no Omocha
Takeru "T.K." Takaishi, a character in Digimon

People with the surname
, Japanese swimmer

Japanese-language surnames